Gliese 876 b is an exoplanet orbiting the red dwarf Gliese 876. It completes one orbit in approximately 61 days. Discovered in June 1998, Gliese 876 b was the first planet to be discovered orbiting a red dwarf.

Discovery
Gliese 876 b was initially announced by Geoffrey Marcy on June 22, 1998 at a symposium of the International Astronomical Union in Victoria, British Columbia, Canada. The discovery was made using data from the Keck and Lick observatories. Only 2 hours after his announcement, he was shown an e-mail from the Geneva Extrasolar Planet Search team confirming the planet. The Geneva team used telescopes at the Haute-Provence Observatory in France and the European Southern Observatory in La Serena, Chile. Like the majority of early extrasolar planet discoveries it was discovered by detecting variations in its star's radial velocity as a result of the planet's gravity. This was done by making sensitive measurements of the Doppler shift of the spectral lines of Gliese 876. It was the first discovered of four known planets in the Gliese 876 system.

Characteristics

Mass, radius, and temperature

Given the planet's high mass, it is likely that Gliese 876 b is a gas giant with no solid surface. Since the planet has only been detected indirectly through its gravitational effects on the star, properties such as its radius, composition, and temperature are unknown. Assuming a composition similar to Jupiter and an environment close to chemical equilibrium, it is predicted that the atmosphere of Gliese 876 b is cloudless, though cooler regions of the planet may be able to form water clouds.

A limitation of the radial velocity method used to detect Gliese 876 b is that only a lower limit on the planet's mass can be obtained. This lower limit is around 1.93 times the mass of Jupiter. The true mass depends on the inclination of the orbit, which in general is unknown. However, because Gliese 876 is only 15 light years from Earth Benedict et al. (2002) were able to use one of the Fine Guidance Sensors on the Hubble Space Telescope to detect the astrometric wobble created by Gliese 876 b. This constituted the first unambiguous astrometric detection of an extrasolar planet. Their analysis suggested that the orbital inclination is 84°±6° (close to edge-on). In the case of Gliese 876 b, modelling the planet-planet interactions from the Laplace resonance shows that the actual inclination of the orbit is 59°, resulting in a true mass of 2.2756 times the mass of Jupiter.

This planet, like c and e, has likely migrated inward.

Host star
The planet orbits a (M-type) star named Gliese 876. The star has a mass of 0.33  and a radius of around 0.36 . It has a surface temperature of 3350 K and is 2.55 billion years old. In comparison, the Sun is about 4.6 billion years old and has a surface temperature of 5778 K.

Orbit

Gliese 876 b is in a 1:2:4 Laplace resonance with the inner planet Gliese 876 c and the outer planet Gliese 876 e: in the time it takes planet e to complete one orbit, planet b completes two and planet c completes four. This is the second known example of a Laplace resonance, the first being Jupiter's moons Io, Europa and Ganymede. As a result, the orbital elements of the planets change fairly rapidly as they dynamically interact with one another. The planet's orbit has a low eccentricity, similar to the planets in the Solar System. The semimajor axis of the orbit is only 0.208 AU, less than that of Mercury in the Solar System. However Gliese 876 is such a faint star that this puts it in the outer part of the habitable zone.

Future habitability

Gliese 876 b currently lies beyond the outer edge of the habitable zone but because Gliese 876 is a slowly evolving main-sequence red dwarf its habitable zone is very slowly moving outwards and will continue to do so for trillions of years. Therefore, Gliese 876 b will, in trillions of years time, lie inside Gliese 876's habitable zone, as defined by the ability of an Earth-mass planet to retain liquid water at its surface, and remain there for at least 4.6 billion years. While the prospects for life on a gas giant are unknown, large moons may be able to support a habitable environment. Models of tidal interactions between a hypothetical moon, the planet and the star suggest that large moons should be able to survive in orbit around Gliese 876 b for the lifetime of the system. On the other hand, it is unclear whether such moons could form in the first place. However, the large mass of the gas giant may make it more likely for larger moons to form.

For a stable orbit the ratio between the moon's orbital period Ps around its primary and that of the primary around its star Pp must be < 1/9, e.g. if a planet takes 90 days to orbit its star, the maximum stable orbit for a moon of that planet is less than 10 days. Simulations suggest that a moon with an orbital period less than about 45 to 60 days will remain safely bound to a massive giant planet or brown dwarf that orbits 1 AU from a Sun-like star. In the case of Gliese 876 b, the orbital period would have to be no greater than a week (7 days) in order to have a stable orbit.

Tidal effects could also allow the moon to sustain plate tectonics, which would cause volcanic activity to regulate the moon's temperature and create a geodynamo effect which would give the satellite a strong magnetic field.

To support an Earth-like atmosphere for about 4.6 billion years (the age of the Earth), the moon would have to have a Mars-like density and at least a mass of 0.07 . One way to decrease loss from sputtering is for the moon to have a strong magnetic field that can deflect stellar wind and radiation belts. NASA's Galileo's measurements hints large moons can have magnetic fields; it found that Jupiter's moon Ganymede has its own magnetosphere, even though its mass is only 0.025 .

See also
 Appearance of extrasolar planets

Notes

References

External links
 
 
 

Gliese 876
Aquarius (constellation)
Exoplanets discovered in 1998
Exoplanets detected by radial velocity
Exoplanets detected by astrometry
Giant planets in the habitable zone
8